This is a list of barangays in Valenzuela in the Philippines based on 2015 census data of the Philippine Statistics Authority.

List of barangays

Alternate names of barangays
 Canumay West is the political name for the barangay but it is sometimes called Canumay.
 Gen. T. de Leon is sometimes spelled as Hen. T. de Leon ("Hen." being Heneral, the Filipino equivalent for Gen. or General), and sometimes abbreviated as GTDL.
 Karuhatan is sometimes spelled as Caruhatan.
 Marulas is sometimes called BBB or simply BB. Balintawak Beer Brewery (BBB) used to be located in Marulas before it was acquired by San Miguel Corporation to form San Miguel Polo Beer Brewery.
 Paso de Blas is sometimes called Tollgate because of Paso de Blas Exit (also known as Malinta Exit and Valenzuela Exit) at Km. 15 of North Luzon Expressway.
 Veinte Reales is sometimes spelled as Viente Reales or Veintereales, with i and e interchanged, without affecting its pronunciation.

Gallery

See also
 List of populated places in Metro Manila

References

Valenzuela, Metro Manila
Valenzuela
Valenzuela